In mathematics, the Banach–Stone theorem is a classical result in the theory of continuous functions on topological spaces, named after the mathematicians Stefan Banach and Marshall Stone.

In brief, the Banach–Stone theorem allows one to recover a compact Hausdorff space X from the Banach space structure of the space C(X) of continuous real- or complex-valued functions on X. If one is allowed to invoke the algebra structure of C(X) this is easy – we can identify X with the spectrum of C(X), the set of algebra homomorphisms into the scalar field, equipped with the weak*-topology inherited from the dual space C(X)*. The Banach-Stone theorem avoids reference to multiplicative structure by recovering X from the extreme points of the unit ball of C(X)*.

Statement
For a compact Hausdorff space X, let C(X) denote the Banach space of continuous real- or complex-valued functions on X, equipped with the supremum norm ‖·‖∞.

Given compact Hausdorff spaces X and Y, suppose T : C(X) → C(Y) is a surjective linear isometry. Then there exists a homeomorphism φ : Y → X and a function g ∈ C(Y) with

such that

The case where X and Y are compact metric spaces is due to Banach, while the extension to compact Hausdorff spaces is due to Stone. In fact, they both prove a slight generalization—they do not assume that T is linear, only that it is an isometry in the sense of metric spaces, and use the Mazur–Ulam theorem to show that T is affine, and so  is a linear isometry.

Generalizations
The Banach–Stone theorem has some generalizations for vector-valued continuous functions on compact, Hausdorff topological spaces. For example, if E is a Banach space with trivial centralizer and X and Y are compact, then every linear isometry of C(X; E) onto C(Y; E) is a strong Banach–Stone map.

A similar technique has also been used to recover a space X from the extreme points of the duals of some other spaces of functions on X.

The noncommutative analog of the Banach-Stone theorem is the folklore theorem that two unital C*-algebras are isomorphic if and only if they are completely isometric (i.e., isometric at all matrix levels). Mere isometry is not enough, as shown by the existence of a C*-algebra that is not isomorphic to its opposite algebra (which trivially has the same Banach space structure).

See also

References 

 *  

Theory of continuous functions
Operator theory
Theorems in functional analysis